The 2014 Pac-12 Football Championship Game was played on Friday, December 5, 2014 at Levi's Stadium in Santa Clara, California. It was the fourth championship game in the history of the Pac-12 Conference. The game featured the Arizona Wildcats against the Oregon Ducks. The two teams met on October 2, with Arizona winning 31–24. Arizona had won two consecutive games versus Oregon. Oregon led the all-time series 24–16 heading into the game. The game started at 6:21 PM PST and was broadcast by FOX. The Oregon Ducks defeated the Arizona Wildcats 51–13 for the championship.

History

The game was the fourth football conference championship for the Pac-12 Conference (or any of its predecessors). Last season, the Stanford Cardinal (7–2) defeated the Arizona State Sun Devils (8–1) 38–14 to win the Championship and represented the conference in the 2014 Rose Bowl Game in Pasadena, California.

Teams

Arizona Wildcats

Arizona is playing in its first Pac-12 Championship game, having completed its first 10-win season. During the season, the team has out-scored its opponents by 84 points.

Oregon Ducks

The Oregon Ducks, with a record of 11-1 this season, will play their second conference championship game. The team defeated the UCLA Bruins 49–31 in the inaugural title game in 2011. During the season, the Ducks out-scored their Pac-12 conference opponents by 170 points. Coming into the game, they were the leader in total, scoring and rushing offense in the conference. Oregon also leads the conference in pass efficiency at 189.0. Quarterback Marcus Mariota completed 229 out of 334 pass attempts with 2 interceptions. Royce Freeman rushed 209 times for 1,185 yards during the regular season.

Game summary

Statistics

See also
 List of Pac-12 Conference football champions

References

Championship
Pac-12 Football Championship Game
Arizona Wildcats football games
Oregon Ducks football games
Sports competitions in Santa Clara, California
Pac-12 Football
Pac-12 Football
American football competitions in California